The 2015 Africa Movie Academy Awards ceremony honouring films of 2014 was scheduled to take place in June 2015 but held on 26 September 2015. The gala night was moved to June as opposed to the regular March–May season in honour of Michael Anyiam-Osigwe, a longtime entertainment patron and brother to the founder and former C.E.O. of the award ceremony, Peace Anyiam-Osigwe. This years' award will be the first in the post-Osigwe's era of the ceremony, after her formal resignation in March.

Ceremony information 
Entries to the ceremony were originally opened from 1 September 2014 to 1 December 2014. However, the closing date was extended to 31 January 2015 to enable more entries. Films and documentaries that were produced from December 2013 to December 2014 were eligible for selection. A total of 800 films were submitted to the Film Academy. The nomination ceremony was held in May before the Nigerian presidential inauguration date on the 29th.

Winners

References

2015 film awards
2015 in Nigerian cinema
Africa Movie Academy Awards ceremonies
Awar